Jung Eun-won (Hangul: 정은원) (born January 17, 2000, in Incheon) is a South Korean infielder for the Hanwha Eagles of the KBO League.

References 

Hanwha Eagles players
KBO League infielders
South Korean baseball players
2000 births
Living people
Sportspeople from Incheon